is the seventeenth single by Bump of Chicken, released on April 21, 2010, just 1 week after the preceding single "Happy". It was written just before Fujiwara turned 30, based on the concept of him talking to his younger self. It was also used by NHK's Minna no Uta between April and May 2010.

Track listing
  - 6:22
  - 4:35
  (hidden track)

Personnel
Fujiwara Motoo — Guitar, vocals
Masukawa Hiroaki — Guitar
Naoi Yoshifumi — Bass
Masu Hideo — Drums

Chart performance

References

External links
Mahō no Ryōri (Kimi kara Kimi e) on the official Bump of Chicken website.

2010 singles
Bump of Chicken songs
Oricon Weekly number-one singles
2010 songs
Toy's Factory singles
Song articles with missing songwriters